Kate Tachie-Menson is a Ghanaian model. In 2008, she became the seventh and first Ghanaian to win M-Net's Face of Africa competition in South Africa.

Career 
In 2006, she auditioned for M-Net's Face of Africa but did not qualify. However, in 2008, she qualified and was crowned the winner, becoming the seventh M-Net Face of Africa. Subsequently, Tachie-Menson has starred in fashion shows including Ready to wear – Autumn/Winter 2009,  Ready to wear – Autumn/Winter 2011, Mercedes-Benz Fashion Week in South Africa, New York and New Delhi fashion week. She has been on magazine covers including Mimi Magazine in Ghana and Canoe Magazine in UK. She as well shot editorials for Elle, Glamour and Cosmopolitan.

References

Living people
Ghanaian fashion
Ghanaian female models
Year of birth missing (living people)